Martín Vellisca González (born 22 August 1971 in Madrid) is a Spanish retired footballer who played as a left winger.

He played 220 La Liga matches over seven seasons, in representation of Salamanca (three years) and Zaragoza (four).

Football career
After starting playing football with amateurs CF Valdepeñas, Vellisca began his professional career at local Getafe CF, before joining UD Salamanca in 1993. From the start he was an undisputed first-choice, never playing in less than 34 games while also experiencing two La Liga promotions and as many relegations to the second division; in the 1997–98 season, as the team retained their top flight status, he participated in a 4–1 win against eventual champions FC Barcelona at the Camp Nou.

From 1999 to 2004, Vellisca played with Real Zaragoza, totalling 104 league matches with eight goals in his first three seasons. After helping the Aragonese to a 2003 return to the top level, he was only a fringe player in the following campaign, and left the side with two Copa del Rey trophies.

Vellisca retired in 2008 at the age of nearly 37, after having spent two seasons each with UD Almería (51 games in division two) and lowly Logroñés CF.

Honours
Zaragoza
Copa del Rey: 2000–01, 2003–04

References

External links

1971 births
Living people
Footballers from Madrid
Spanish footballers
Association football wingers
La Liga players
Segunda División players
Segunda División B players
Atlético Madrid B players
Getafe CF footballers
UD Salamanca players
Real Zaragoza players
UD Almería players
Logroñés CF footballers